The Art Deco Landmark is a 32-story,  residential skyscraper completed in 2018 and located in Xitun District, Taichung, Taiwan. As of October 2021, it is the 35th tallest building in Taichung. Designed in the Art Deco style (hence its name), the building was constructed under strict requirements of preventing damage caused by earthquakes and typhoons common in Taiwan.

See also 
 List of tallest buildings in Taiwan
 List of tallest buildings in Taichung

References

2018 establishments in Taiwan
Residential skyscrapers in Taiwan
Skyscrapers in Taichung
Apartment buildings in Taiwan
Residential buildings completed in 2018
Taichung's 7th Redevelopment Zone